John Savvas Romanides (2 March 19271 November 2001) was a Roman (Ρωμαίος/Ρωμηός) theologian, Eastern Orthodox priest, and scholar who had a distinctive influence on post-war Greek Orthodox theology.

Biography
Born in Piraeus, Greece, on 2 March 1928, his parents emigrated to the United States when he was only two months old. He grew up in Manhattan, graduating from the Hellenic College, Brookline, Massachusetts. After attending Yale Divinity School, he received his Ph.D. from the University of Athens.

From 1956 to 1965 he was Professor of Dogmatic Theology at the Holy Cross Theological School in Brookline, Massachusetts. In 1968 he was appointed as tenured Professor of Dogmatic Theology at the University of Thessaloniki, Greece, a position he held until his retirement in 1982. His latest position was Professor of Theology at Balamand Theological School, in Lebanon. Romanides died in Athens, Greece on 1 November 2001.

Theology

Romanides belonged to the "theological generation of the 1960s", which pleaded for a "return to the Fathers", and led to "the acute polarization of the East-West divide and the cultivation of an anti-Western, anti-ecumenical sentiment." According to Kalaitzidis, his early theological interests are "wide and broad-minded", but narrowed with the publication of Romiosini in 1975, which postulates an absolute divide between the Eastern Churches and the Western Church: "[h]ereafter, the West is wholly demonized and proclaimed responsible for all the misfortunes of the Orthodox, both theological and historical/national."

Romanides contributed many speculations, some controversial, into the cultural and religious differences between Eastern and Western Christianity. According to Romanides, these divergences have impacted the ways in which Christianity has developed and been lived out in the Christian cultures of East and West. According to Romanides, these divergences were due to the influences of the Franks, who were culturally very different from the Romans.

His theological works emphasize the empirical (experiential) basis of theology called theoria or vision of God, (as opposed to a rational or reasoned understanding of theory) as the essence of Orthodox theology, setting it "apart from all other religions and traditions", especially the Frankish-dominated western Church which distorted this true spiritual path. Studying extensively the works of 14th-century Byzantine theologian St. Gregory Palamas, he stated religion to be identical with sickness, and the so-called Jesus prayer of hesychasm to be both the cure of this sickness and the core of Christian tradition:

His research on dogmatic theology led him to the conclusion of a close link between doctrinal differences and historical developments. Thus, in his later years, he concentrated on historical research, mostly of the Middle Ages but also of the 18th and 19th centuries.

Augustine of Hippo
Romanides sees St Augustine as the great antagonist of Orthodox thought. Romanides claims that, although he was a saint, Augustine did not have theoria. Many of his theological conclusions, Romanides says, appear not to come from experiencing God and writing about his experiences of God; rather, they appear to be the result of philosophical or logical speculation and conjecture. Hence, Augustine is still revered as a saint, but, according to Romanides, does not qualify as a theologian in the Eastern Orthodox church.

Original sin versus ancestral sin
Romanides rejects the Roman Catholic teachings on Original Sin. Orthodox theologians trace this position to having its roots in the works of Saint Augustine. Eastern Orthodoxy, Oriental Orthodoxy, and the Assyrian Church of the East, which together make up Eastern Christianity, contemplate that the introduction of ancestral sin into the human race affected the subsequent environment for humanity, but never accepted Augustine of Hippo's notions of original sin and hereditary guilt. It holds that original sin does not have the character of a personal fault in any of Adam's descendants.

Rejection of St. Augustine
Eastern Orthodox theologians John Romanides and George Papademetriou say that some of Augustine's teachings were actually condemned as those of Barlaam the Calabrian at the Hesychast or Fifth Council of Constantinople 1351. It is the vision or revelation of God (theoria) that gives one knowledge of God. Theoria, contemplatio in Latin, as indicated by John Cassian, meaning vision of God, is closely connected with theosis (divinization).

John Romanides reports that Augustinian theology is generally ignored in the Eastern Orthodox church.  Romanides claims that the Roman Catholic Church, starting with Augustine, has removed the mystical experience (revelation) of God (theoria) from Christianity and replaced it with the conceptualization of revelation through the philosophical speculation of metaphysics. Romanides does not consider the metaphysics of Augustine to be Orthodox but Pagan mysticism. Romanides states that Augustine's Platonic mysticism was condemned by the Eastern Orthodox within the church condemnation of Barlaam of Calabria at the Hesychast councils in Constantinople.

Criticism
The Greek Old Calendarist, Archimandrite [later Archbishop] Chrysostomos González of Etna, CA, criticized Romanides' criticism of Augustine:

Heaven and Hell

According to Romanides, the theological concept of hell, or eternal damnation is expressed differently within Eastern and Western Christianity. According to John S. Romanides, "the Frankish [i.e. Western] understanding of heaven and hell" is "foreign to the Orthodox tradition".

According to Romanides, the Orthodox Church teaches that both Heaven and Hell are being in God's presence, which is being with God and seeing God, and that there is no such place as where God is not, nor is Hell taught in the East as separation from God. One expression of the Eastern teaching is that hell and heaven are being in God's presence, as this presence is punishment and paradise depending on the person's spiritual state in that presence. For one who hates God, to be in the presence of God eternally would be the gravest suffering. Aristotle Papanikolaou  and Elizabeth H. Prodromou  wrote in their book Thinking Through Faith: New Perspectives from Orthodox Christian Scholars that for the Orthodox the theological symbols of heaven and hell are not crudely understood as spatial destinations but rather refer to the experience of God's presence according to two different modes.

The saved and the damned will both experience God's light, the Tabor light. However, the saved will experience this light as Heaven, while the damned will experience it as Hell. Theories explicitly identifying Hell with an experience of the divine light may go back as far as Theophanes of Nicea. According to Iōannēs Polemēs, Theophanes believed that, for sinners, "the divine light will be perceived as the punishing fire of hell".

Other Eastern Orthodox theologians describe hell as separation from God. Archimandrite Sophrony (Sakharov) speaks of "the hell of separation from God". "The circumstances that rise before us, the problems we encounter, the relationships we form, the choices we make, all ultimately concern our eternal union with or separation from God." "Hell is nothing else but separation of man from God, his autonomy excluding him from the place where God is present." "Hell is a spiritual state of separation from God and inability to experience the love of God, while being conscious of the ultimate deprivation of it as punishment." "Hell is none other than the state of separation from God, a condition into which humanity was plunged for having preferred the creature to the Creator. It is the human creature, therefore, and not God, who engenders hell. Created free for the sake of love, man possesses the incredible power to reject this love, to say 'no' to God. By refusing communion with God, he becomes a predator, condemning himself to a spiritual death (hell) more dreadful than the physical death that derives from it."

According to Iōannēs Polemēs, the important Orthodox theologian Gregory Palamas did not believe that sinners would experience the divine light: "Unlike Theophanes, Palamas did not believe that sinners could have an experience of the divine light [...] Nowhere in his works does Palamas seem to adopt Theophanes' view that the light of Tabor is identical with the fire of hell."

Theosis

The practice of ascetic prayer called hesychasm in the Eastern Orthodox Church is centered on the enlightenment, deification (theosis) of man. Theosis has also been referred to as "glorification", "union with God",  "becoming god by Grace", "self-realization", "the acquisition of the Holy Spirit", "experience of the uncreated light" (Tabor light).

Theosis (Greek for "making divine", "deification", "to become gods by Grace", and for "divinization", "reconciliation, union with God" and "glorification") is expressed as "Being, union with God" and having a relationship or synergy between God and man. God is Heaven, God is the Kingdom of Heaven, the uncreated is that which is infinite and unending, glory to glory. Since this synergy or union is without fusion it is based on free will and not the irresistibly of the divine (i.e. the monophysite). Since God is transcendent (incomprehensible in ousia, essence or being), the West has over-emphasized its point through logical arguments that God cannot be experienced in this life.

According to Romanides, following Vladimir Lossky in his interpretation of St. Gregory Palamas, the teaching that God is transcendent (incomprehensible in ousia, essence or being), has led in the West to the (mis)understanding that God cannot be experienced in this life. Romanides states that Western theology is more dependent upon logic and reason, culminating in scholasticism used to validate truth and the existence of God, than upon establishing a relationship with God (theosis and theoria).

Influence
According to Kalaitzidis, Romanides had a strong influence on contemporary Greek Orthodoxy, to such an extent that some speak about "pre- and post-Romanidian theology". Kalaitzidis further notes that Romanides' post-1975 theology has "furnished a convenient and comforting conspiratorial explanation for the historical woes of Orthodoxy and Romiosyne", but is "devoid of the slightest traces of self-criticism, since blame is always placed upon others". James L. Kelley's recent article has argued that Kalaitzidis's concern that Orthodox theologians engage in "self-criticism" is a ploy to engineer a "development of Orthodox doctrine" so that, once the Orthodox place some of the blame on themselves for "divisions of Christian groups", they will adjust the teachings of Orthodoxy to suit the ecumenist agenda (see James L. Kelley, "Romeosyne" According to John Romanides and Christos Yannaras: A Response to Pantelis Kalaitzidis [Norman, OK: Romanity Pres, 2016]).

Works

Articles
Several of his articles can be found at the website dedicated to him. Among his books are:

Books
Dogmatic and Symbolic Theology of the Orthodox Catholic Church (in Greek; Thessaloniki: Pournaras, 1973).
Romiosini, Romania, Roumeli (in Greek; Thessaloniki: Pournaras, 1975).
 
An Interplay Between Theology and Society.
Empirical Theology versus Speculative Theology.
The Filioque.

See also
 Vladimir Lossky
 Michael Pomazansky
 George Metallinos
 George Dragas
 Metropolitan Hierotheos (Vlachos) of Nafpaktos

Notes

Citations

References

Sources

Further reading
Kelley, James L. A Realism of Glory: Lectures On Christology in the Works of Protopresbyter John Romanides (Rollinsford, NH: Orthodox Research Institute, 2009).
Kelley, James L. "Protopresbyter John Romanides's Teaching on Creation." International Journal of Orthodox Theology 7.1 (2016): 42–61.
Sopko, Andrew J. *Prophet of Roman Orthodoxy: The Theology of John Romanides (Dewdney, B.C.: Synaxis Press, 2003).
Kelley, James L. "Romeosyne" According to Protopresbyter John Romanides and Christos Yannaras: A Response to Pantelis Kalaitzidis (Norman, OK: Romanity Press, 2016).
Kelley, James L. "Yoga and Eastern Orthodoxy: Fr. John Romanides and the New Age." 160-170 in Orthodoxy, History, and Esotericism: New Studies (Dewdney, B.C.: Synaxis Press, 2016).
Payne, D. P.  (2006), The Revival of Political Hesychasm in Greek Orthodox Thought, PhD dissertation.
Sopko, Andrew J. (2003), Prophet of Roman Orthodoxy: The Theology of John Romanides, Synaxis Press.

External links

Works
 Works of Romanides online

Ideas
 Nicolas Prevelakis, Theologies as Alternative Histories: John Romanides and Chrestos Yannaras

Criticism
 romanity.org, Fabrications about professor John S. Romanides by Capuchino priest Yannis Spiteris. Response by Prof. George Metallinos of The University of Athens
 Romanides: A Sympathetic but Critical Reading 
 Vladimir Moss, Against Romanides

Cappadocian Greeks
Writers from Brookline, Massachusetts
Greek Eastern Orthodox priests
American Christian theologians
1928 births
2001 deaths
American Eastern Orthodox priests
Eastern Orthodox priests in the United States
20th-century Eastern Orthodox priests
Eastern Orthodox theologians
Writers from Piraeus
Greek theologians
Critics of the Catholic Church
Academic staff of the Aristotle University of Thessaloniki
20th-century American clergy